This is a list of schools in the Montreal Catholic School Commission.

Schools at the time of closure

Anglophone schools
Secondary:
 James Lyng High School
 James Lyng Centre
 John F. Kennedy Comprehensive High School
 John F. Kennedy Centre
 Lester B. Pearson Comprehensive High School
 Marymount Academy
 Marymount Centre
 Paul VI High School
 Sir Wilfrid Laurier High School
 St. Pius X Comprehensive High School
 St. Pius X Centre
 St. Raphael High School
 Vincent Massey Collegiate
 
Elementary:
 Edward Murphy
 Emily Carr
 Francesca Cabrini
 Frederick Banting
 Gerald McShane
 John Caboto
 John XXIII
 Leonardo da Vinci
 Michelangelo (Rivière-des-Prairies)
 Nazareth
 Our Lady of Pompei
 St. Brendan
 St. Dorothy
 St. Gabriel
 St. Ignatius of Loyola
 St. John Bosco
 St. Kevin
 St. Monica
 St. Patrick
 St. Raphael Centre

Francophone secondary schools

 Accès Est
 Accès Ouest
 Accès Nord
 École secondaire Calixa-Lavallée
 Centre Bathélemy-Vimont
 Centre Calixa-Lavallée
 Centre Champagnat
 Centre de commerce et de secrétariat Stella-Maris
 Centre de ressources en éducation populaire (CREP)
 Centre Gabrielle-Roy
 Centre Gédéon-Ouimet
 Centre La Clairière
 Centre Lartigue
 Centre Louis-Fréchette
 Centre Lucien-Pagé
 Centre Père-Marquette
 Centre Pierre-Dupuy
 Centre Saint-Henri
 Centre Saint-Louis
 Centre Saint-Pascal-Baylon
 Centre Saint-Paul
 Centre Sainte-Croix
 Centre Yves-Thériault
 Chomedey-de Maisonneuve
 École des métiers de l’aérospatiale de Montréal
 École des métiers de l’automobile
 École des métiers de la construction de Montréal
 École Internationale (secondaire)
 École Marguerite-de-Lajemmerais
 Édouard-Montpetit
 École secondaire Eulalie-Durocher
 Évangéline
 Georges-Vanier
 Henri-Bourassa
 Honoré-Mercier
 Jean-Grou
 Jean-Grou, annexe
 Jeanne-Mance
 École secondaire Joseph-François-Perrault
 Laurier
 Le Tremplin
 Louis-Joseph-Papineau
 Louis-Riel
 Louise-Trichet
 Lucien-Pagé
 Marc-Laflamme
 École secondaire Marguerite-De Lajemmerais
 École secondaire Marie-Anne
 Pavillon d’éducation communautaire
 
 Pierre-Dupuy
 Rosalie-Jetté
 Saint-Henri
 Saint-Luc
 École secondaire Sophie-Barat
 Urgel-Archambault

Francophone primary schools

 Adélard-Desrosiers
 Alice-Parizeau
 Alphonse-Desjardins
 Arc-en-ciel (alternative school)
 Armand-Lavergne
 Atelier (alternative school)
 Baril
 Barthélemy-Vimont 
 Barthélemy-Vimont, annexe 1 
 Barthélemy-Vimont, annexe 2 
 Bienville 
 Boucher-de-la-Bruère 
 Champlain 
 Charles-Bruneau 
 Charles-Lemoyne 
 Charlevoix (annexe Ludger-Duvernay) 
 Christ-Roi 
 Coeur-Immaculé-de-Marie 
 De la Petite-Bourgogne 
 Denise-Pelletier 
 *Dollard-des-Ormeaux 
 École Internationale (primary) 
 Élan (alternative school) (annexe Lanaudière) 
 Étoile Filante (alternative school) 
 Félix-Leclerc 
 Fernand-Gauthier 
 Fernand-Seguin 
 François-de-Laval 
 Gadbois 
 Garneau 
 Guillaume-Couture 
 Guybourg 
 Guy-Vanier 
 Hélène-Boullé 
 Henri-Julien 
 Hochelaga 
 Jean-Baptiste-Meilleur 
 Jean-Jacques-Olier 
 Jean-Nicolet 
 Jeanne-Leber 
 Jules-Verne 
 La Dauversière 
 La Mennais 
 La Vérendrye 
 La Visitation 
 Lambert-Closse 
 Lanaudière 
 Le Carignan 
 Le Caron 
 Le Plateau 
 Les Enfants du Monde 
 Louis-Colin 
 Louis-Dupire 
 Louis-Hippolyte-Lafontaine 
 Ludger-Duvernay 
 Madeleine-de-Verchères 
 Maîtrise des petits chanteurs du Mont-Royal 
 Marc-Aurèle-Fortin 
 Marguerite-Bourgeoys 
 Marie-de-l’Incarnation 
 Marie-Favery 
 Marie-Reine-des-Coeurs 
 Marie-Rivier 
 Marie-Rivier, annexe 
 Marie-Rollet 
 Montcalm 
 Notre-Dame-de-Fatima 
 Notre-Dame-de-Grâce 
 Notre-Dame-de-Grâce, annexe 
 Notre-Dame-de-l’Assomption 
 Notre-Dame-de-la-Défense 
 Notre-Dame-de-la-Paix 
 Notre-Dame-des-Neiges 
 Notre-Dame-des-Victoires 
 Notre-Dame-du-Foyer 
 Notre-Dame-du-Perpétuel-Secours 
 Paul-Bruchési 
 Philippe-Labarre 
 Pierre-de-Coubertin 
 René-Guénette 
 Rose-des-vents (alternative school) 
 Saint-Albert-le-Grand 
 Saint-Ambroise 
 Saint-André-Apôtre 
 Saint-Anselme 
 Saint-Antoine-Marie-Claret 
 Saint-Antonin 
 Saint-Arsène 
 Saint-Barthélémy 
 Saint-Benoit 
 Saint-Bernardin 
 Saint-Clément 
 Saint-Damase 
 Saint-Donat 
 Saint-Émile 
 Saint-Enfant-Jésus 
 Saint-Étienne 
 Saint-Fabien 
 Saint-François-d’Assise 
 Saint-François-Solano 
 Saint-François-Xavier 
 Saint-Gabriel-Lalemant 
 Saint-Gérard 
 Saint-Grégoire-le-Grand 
 Saint-Isaac-Jogues 
 Saint-Jean-Baptiste 
 Saint-Jean-Baptiste-de-la-Salle 
 Saint-Jean-de-Brébeuf 
 Saint-Jean-de-la-Croix 
 Saint-Jean-de-la-Lande 
 Saint-Jean-de-Matha 
 Saint-Jean-Vianney 
 Saint-Justin 
 Saint-Léon 
 Saint-Louis 
 Saint-Louis-de-Gonzague 
 Saint-Marc 
 Saint-Mathieu 
 Saint-Noël-Chabanel 
 Saint-Nom-de-Jésus 
 Saint-Pascal-Baylon 
 Saint-Pascal-Baylon, annexe 
 Saint-Paul-de-la-Croix 
 Saint-Pierre-Apôtre 
 Saint-Pierre-Claver 
 Saint-Rémi 
 Saint-Simon-Apôtre 
 Saint-Vincent-Marie 
 Saint-Zotique 
 Sainte-Bernadette-Soubirous 
 Sainte-Bibiane 
 Sainte-Catherine-de-Sienne 
 Sainte-Cécile 
 Sainte-Claire 
 Sainte-Colette 
 Sainte-Gemma-Galgani 
 Sainte-Gertrude 
 Sainte-Jeanne-d’Arc 
 Sainte-Louise-de-Marillac 
 Sainte-Lucie 
 Sainte-Odile 
 Saints-Martyrs-Canadiens 
 Victor-Doré 
 Victor-Rousselot

References

Schools in Montreal